Doto ostenta is a species of sea slug, a nudibranch, a marine gastropod mollusc in the family Dotidae.

Distribution
This species was described from south-eastern Australia. It is found in the states of Victoria and New South Wales in water depths of 0 m to 85 m.

Description
This nudibranch is transparent white with small spots and patches of black scattered on the back and sides of the body. The typical Doto cerata have moderately elongate tubercles which each have a black spot at the tip. The digestive gland inside the cerata is a pink cream colour.

Ecology
Doto ostenta is found on hydroids, on which it presumably feeds.

References

Dotidae
Gastropods described in 1958